Mohammed Omar Zain Mohsen Al-Attas (born 5 August 1997) is an Emirati soccer player who plays for Al Jazira as a defender.

International career

International goals
Scores and results list the United Arab Emirates' goal tally first.

References

External links
 

Emirati footballers
1997 births
Living people
Al Jazira Club players
UAE Pro League players
Association football defenders
Footballers at the 2018 Asian Games
Asian Games bronze medalists for the United Arab Emirates
Asian Games medalists in football
Medalists at the 2018 Asian Games
United Arab Emirates international footballers